Thomas Roe was an English diplomat.

Thomas Roe may also refer to:

Thomas Roe, 1st Baron Roe (1832–1923), British businessman and Liberal politician
Tommy Roe (born 1942), singer-songwriter
Tommy Roe (footballer) (1900–1972), English footballer
Thomas A. Roe (1927–2000), American businessman and conservative philanthropist

See also
Thomas Rowe (disambiguation)